The orange-tailed finesnout skink (Ctenotus leae)  is a species of skink found in Australia.

References

leae
Reptiles described in 1887
Taxa named by George Albert Boulenger